The Malvern Museum in Great Malvern, the town centre of Malvern, Worcestershire, England, is located in the Priory Gatehouse, the former gateway to the Great Malvern Priory. The museum  was established in 1979 and is owned and managed by the Malvern Museum Society Ltd, a registered charity. The Priory Gatehouse was a gift to the museum in 1980 from the de Vere Group, the owners of the neighbouring Abbey Hotel, and is staffed by volunteers. As such, the building itself is the museum's major exhibit.

Among the museum's exhibits are many local artefacts and archaeological findings dating from the Iron Age hill fort at the British Camp, to recent history. A series of rooms depicts different periods of history and include lifelike displays and information boards. Themes covered include natural history, Malvern Priory, Malvern Forest and Chase, life in Victorian Malvern, Edward Elgar, the Malvern Festival, the history of the local economy including the 19th century hydrotherapy using Malvern water (instrumental in the settlement's rapid growth from a village to a large town), the development of radar by TRE, and Morgan Motor Company cars.

The museum is open daily, 10.30 to 17.00, from 25 March to 31 October.

Priory gatehouse
Erroneously referred to as the Abbey Gateway, it was built around 1480 and is the second oldest building in Malvern after the Norman priory church. The gatehouse is the only other remaining building of the 12th century Benedictine monastery that  was dismantled in 1539 during the Dissolution of the Monasteries by King Henry VIII of England.

References

External links
Official Museum website

History museums in Worcestershire
Buildings and structures in Malvern, Worcestershire
Museums in Worcestershire
Local museums in Worcestershire
Museums established in 1979
1979 establishments in England
Gates in England
Gatehouses (architecture)
Malvern, Worcestershire